Senser are a politically charged UK rap rock band, originally formed in South West London from a group of friends in the late 1980s. The initial line-up was called ‘Senser Element’ and consisted of Nick Michaelson (guitar), Kerstin Haigh (vocals), Steve Morton (drums and beatbox), and James Barrett (bass).  The band played in Steve’s front room in his mums flat in Wimbledon Park. Steve’s mum and dad were classical violinists playing for the Royal Philarmonic Orchestra but his dad was ejected due to his outspoken and rebellious behaviour in rehearsals. Steve’s Dad; Garth, introduced Steve and his friends to the music of jazz legends like Miles Davis, Billy Cobham and Mahavishnu Orchestra and Psychedelic music from artists like Can, Jimi Hendrix, Hawkwind and Syd Barrett

In the 1980’s Steve Morton and James Barrett were also getting immersed in the London Electro scene which brought a fusion of Funk and Hip Hop sounds from New York. Steve also participated in beatbox battles and received respect for his skills at just 14 years old at the London Electro club ‘Spatz’. Early influences like Man Parish, Beastie Boys, NWA, West Street Mob, KRS1, Public Enemy added so much to the burgeoning sound of the band. At the same time Nick was honing his guitar skills to bands like Slayer, Anthrax and Black Sabbath. Kerstin had been a busker, singing 70’s rock music, having scoured through her family's vinyl collection of Led Zeppelin, Rolling Stones, Jimi Hendrix & Crosby, Stills & Nash. Classical instruments like tabla and learning sitar, from her travels in India drew her to albums like Peter Gabriel’s soundtrack ‘Passion’ and singer, Sheila Chandra. 
These diverse and juxtaposed elements were being drawn together and the sound of Senser started to form.

Heitham Al-Sayed joined initially as a percussionist. What he really wanted to add was rapping, which was received with a mixed response, but Kerstin was positive that this would create something exciting in the music and Heitham started to write rhymes. The band were in ‘Albert Hall Studios’ when the steps to creating their first album ‘Stacked Up’ were taken, with an early tape recording ‘Music For The Mind And Body’ that included songs like; ‘Journey of Life’ and ‘What’s Going On’. 

In 1988 Steve Morton had to leave due to health issues and John Morgan (drums) joined. 

Kerstin posed the idea about finding a live engineer that would be a member of the band and produce the sound as an influence on the album that was developing. 
The band met Alan "Hagos/Haggis" Haggarty (engineer, producer, programmer) at the George Robey Pub in North London. 

The band started to look for a DJ to join and in 1992 they were joined by Spiral Tribe D.J, Andy Clinton. The band toured in support of psychedelic rockers the Ozric Tentacles in 1992. In 1993, the band were signed to Ultimate Records.

History
In 1993, Senser released two indie singles on Ultimate – "Eject" and "The Key".

In March 1994, Senser released their third single, "Switch", which entered the UK Singles Chart at number 39. Senser's first album, Stacked Up, was released in May 1994, and entered the UK Albums Chart at number 4.

At the beginning of 1995, Senser toured the UK supported by Skunk Anansie before setting off to tour the United States with Moby. It was during this tour that the band decided to split over musical differences. Al-Sayed and Morgan left to form a new band with Haggis called Lodestar. The remaining members of Senser found a new drummer, Paul Soden, and set about writing Senser's second album.

During the spring of 1997, they recorded the second album.  And in the summer of 1997 De-Senser released "Om".

In the summer of 1998, Haigh was able to tour and the band released the second album, Asylum. Once again musical differences became apparent and in February 1999 the band decided to split.

In 2003, the original line-up reunited originally to perform at one show, but decided to re-form and record again. They released their third studio album SCHEMAtic in 2004. A concert performance was released in 2006 as Live At The Underworld.

In 2009, they released How To Do Battle.

In 2013, they released their fifth album To the Capsules via Pledgemusic and toured with Erika Footman on vocals in place of Kerstin Haigh.

In 2014, to celebrate the 20th anniversary of their debut Stacked Up, the band re-released the album in expanded edition with a remastered version of the original tracks on the first CD, and bonus tracks from the era (remixes and previously unreleased songs) on the second disc.

Soundtracks to films
"The Key" was used as part of the cult extreme 1990s ski film, The Tribe.

Senser's song "States of Mind" from Stacked Up, was used as the soundtrack to the well-known demoscene production, State of Mind, by Bomb.

In 2012, one of their songs was also used in the soundtrack to the film Learning Hebrew: A Gothsploitation Movie.

Discography

Albums

Stacked Up (1994) Ultimate/A&M
UK No. 4
 States of Mind
 The Key
 Switch
 Age of Panic
 What's Going On
 One Touch One Bounce
 Stubborn
 Door Game
 Peanut Head
 Peace
 Eject
 No Comply
 Worth

Asylum (1998) Ultimate
UK No. 73
 Book of Flies
 Charming Demons
 Adrenaline
 Strange Asylum
 Burn Out
 Desensitised
 Breed
 Lizard
 Oyster
 Weatherman

Asylum (Limited Edition) (1998) "Senser Vs. De:Senser"
 Charming Demons (DJ "Awe" mix)
 Eye Kaleid
 Tried & Untested
 Om (Harry Hogg mix)
 Rows of People
 Gabba Man

Parallel Charge (2001) Strike Back
 Age Of Panic
 Charming Demons
 States Of Mind
 Strange Asylum
 Switch
 Breed
 The Key
 Adrenalin
 Eject
 Lizard
 Stubborn
 Book of Flies
 No Comply
 Desensitized

SCHEMAtic (2004) One Little Indian
 Silent By
 101 Infoburner
 Bulletproof
 Formula Milk
 Crucible
 Return to Zombie Island
 An Astounding Spectacle
 Photographed Files
 Bomb Factories
 A Conscious War
 The Brunt

How To Do Battle (2009) Imprint
 Wake Up, You’re On Fire
 Resistance Now
 Brightest Rays
 2 3 Clear
 Dictator Bling
 End Of The World Show
 Smoking Paranoia
 Sandhurst in Zero G
 So Refined
 Hex
 Fairytale
 Lights Out
 Arturo
 Blind (iTunes Bonus Track)

To The Capsules (2013)
 Devoid
 Time Travel Scratch 
 Witch Village
 Wounded Spectre
 Break The Order 
 Alpha Omega 
 Liquidity 
 Echelon 
 Chemtrails 
 Let There Be War

Singles
"Eject" (1993), Ultimate
"The Key" (1993), Ultimate – UK #47
"Switch" (1994), Ultimate – UK #39
"Age of Panic" (1994), Ultimate – UK #52
"Charming Demons" (1996), Ultimate – UK #42
"Adrenalin" (1998), Ultimate - UK #85
"Breed" (1998), Ultimate - UK #76
"Weatherman", Ultimate – promo only
De:Senser EP (1998), Ultimate
"The Brunt" (2004), One Little Indian
"Bulletproof" / "Crucible" (2004), One Little Indian
"Resistance Now" (2009), Imprint
Biting Rhymes EP (2011), Imprint – features hiphop covers

Videos/DVDs
States of Mind (1995), Ultimate (VHS)
Live at the Underworld (2006), Ignite (DVD/CD)

Members

Current
 Heitham Al-Sayed (b. 27 February 1971) (lead vocals/percussion, 1992–1995, 1999–present) He is of Saudi and English parentage; also associated with Fiend and (previously) Lodestar.
 Nick Michaelson (guitar, 1992–present)
 James Barrett (bass, 1992–present)
 John Morgan (drums, 1992–1995, 1999–present)
 Kerstin Haigh (vocals/flute, 1992–2011, 2013-present)

Former
 Alan "Hagos/Haggis" Haggarty (sound engineering/programming/producer, 1992–1994, 1999–2004)
 Paul Soden (drums, 1995–1999)
 Erika Footman (vocals, 2013)
 Andy "Awe" Clinton (turntables, 1992–2017)

References

Bibliography
 In Performance (New York Times)
 Rolling Stone Magazine - Transglobal Underground review

External links
 

English hip hop groups
Musical groups from London
Rapcore groups
Rap rock groups
Rap metal musical groups